Leiothrix is a genus of passerine birds in the family Leiothrichidae. They belong to a clade also containing at least the liocichlas, barwings, minlas and sibias. The sibias are possibly their closest living relatives.

Taxonomy
The genus Leiothrix was introduced in 1832 by the English naturalist William John Swainson with the red-billed leiothrix as the type species. The genus name combines the Ancient Greek leios meaning "smooth" and thrix meaning "hair".

The genus contains two species:

Their delicate colors and accomplished song make them popular cagebirds.

References

 Cibois, Alice (2003): Mitochondrial DNA Phylogeny of Babblers (Timaliidae). Auk 120(1): 1-20. DOI: 10.1642/0004-8038(2003)120[0035:MDPOBT]2.0.CO;2 HTML fulltext without images
 Collar, N. J. & Robson C. 2007. Family Timaliidae (Babblers)  pp. 70 – 291 in; del Hoyo, J., Elliott, A. & Christie, D.A. eds. Handbook of the Birds of the World, Vol. 12. Picathartes to Tits and Chickadees. Lynx Edicions, Barcelona.

 
Bird genera
Leiothrichidae